Ach-na-Cloich is a closed railway station located on the south shore of Loch Etive, in Argyll and Bute. Its site is located on the Oban route of the scenic West Highland Line, that was part of the Callander and Oban Railway.

The local village is called Achnacloich, although the Callander and Oban Railway named the station "Ach-na-Cloich".

History 
Opened by the Callander and Oban Railway, it became part of the London, Midland and Scottish Railway during the Grouping of 1923. Passing to the Scottish Region of British Railways on nationalisation in 1948, it was then closed by the British Railways Board.

The site today 
Trains on the Oban section of the West Highland Line pass the site of the closed station. The single platform remains in situ but the wooden station building, which survived long after closure, has now gone.

References

Notes

Sources 
 
 
 
 
 Station on navigable O.S. map

Railway stations in Great Britain opened in 1881
Railway stations in Great Britain closed in 1917
Railway stations in Great Britain opened in 1919
Railway stations in Great Britain closed in 1965
Disused railway stations in Argyll and Bute
Beeching closures in Scotland
Former Caledonian Railway stations
1881 establishments in Scotland